The 1970 PGA Tour season was played from January 8 to December 13. The season consisted of 45 official money events. Billy Casper won the most tournaments, four, and there were six first-time winners. The tournament results and award winners are listed below.

Schedule
The following table lists official events during the 1970 season.

Unofficial events
The following events were sanctioned by the PGA Tour, but did not carry official money, nor were wins official.

Awards

Notes

External links
PGA Tour official site
1970 season coverage at golfstats.com

PGA Tour seasons
PGA Tour